Gotta Kick It Up! is a 2002 Disney Channel Original Movie. In the United States, it debuted on July 26, 2002. It is based on a true story of a middle school dance team. The film was directed by Ramón Menéndez.

Plot

A young executive turned teacher helps a group of young Latina girls find themselves and overcome societal obstacles through their dance troupe.

Cast
 Camille Guaty as Daisy Salinas
 America Ferrera as Yolanda "Yoli" Vargas
 Jhoanna Flores as Alyssa Cortez
 Suilma Rodriguez as Marisol
 Sabrina Wiener as Esmeralda Reyna
 Miguel Sandoval as Principal Zavala
 Erik Alexander Gavica as "Chuy"
 Susan Egan as Heather Bartlett
 Elizabeth Sung as Ms. Kim
 Gina Gallego as Mrs. Cortez
 Gerry Del Sol as Mr. Cortez
 Valente Rodriguez as Mr. Reyna
 Anita Ortega as Mrs. Reyna
 Yvonne Farrow as Lynell Elliott
 Ulises Cuadra as Segura

References

External links
 

2002 television films
2002 films
American teen comedy-drama films
American dance films
2000s English-language films
Disney Channel Original Movie films
Films directed by Ramón Menéndez
Films about Mexican Americans
2000s teen comedy-drama films
Films scored by Craig Safan
Films set in Los Angeles
Films about educators
American coming-of-age comedy-drama films
Coming-of-age films based on actual events
American comedy-drama television films
2000s American films